Acraga ingenescens is a moth of the family Dalceridae. It is found in Venezuela. The habitat probably consists of tropical lower montane moist forests.

The length of the forewings is about 17 mm (0.669 in).

References

Dalceridae
Moths described in 1927